The Savoy Castle Alpine Botanical Garden (1,000 m2) is an alpine botanical garden located at 1350 meters altitude on the grounds of Savoy Castle, Gressoney-Saint-Jean, Aosta Valley, Italy. It is open daily in the warmer months.

The garden was established in 1990 within the castle's park, and is operated by the government of Autonomous Region Aosta Valley. 

The garden focuses on the aesthetic appearance of its species which are planted in rocky beds. 
Species include Aquilegia alpina, Arnica montana, Epilobium angustifolium, Gentiana, Leontopodium alpinum, Lilium martagon, Rhododendron ferrugineum, Saxifraga, Sempervivum arachnoideum, Sempervivum montanum, and Trollius europaeus.

The park was created in 1898 by Queen Margherita of Savoy.

See also 
 List of botanical gardens in Italy

References 
 From the official site of Aosta Valley region (French/Italian)
 BGCI entry
 L'Italia dei giardini, Touring club italiano, Touring Editore, 2005, page 14. .

Botanical gardens in Italy
Gardens in Aosta Valley
Gressoney-Saint-Jean